The 1949 Hardin–Simmons Cowboys football team was an American football team that represented Hardin–Simmons University in the Border Conference during the 1949 college football season. In its sixth season under head coach Warren B. Woodson, the team compiled a 6–4–1 record (4–2 against conference opponents), tied for third place in the conference, and outscored opponents by a total of 318 to 189.

The team was led by halfback Hook Davis, quarterback John "Model T" Ford, and end Bob McChesney, all three of whom were named to the 1949 All-Border Conference football team. Ford threw 26 touchdown passes in 11 games during the 1949 season, breaking the national record of 22 set one year earlier by Nevada quarterback Stan Heath.

Schedule

References

Hardin-Simmons
Hardin–Simmons Cowboys football seasons
Hardin-Simmons Cowboys football